David Leonard may refer to:

David Leonard (record producer), Grammy-award-winning audio producer
David Leonard (cricketer) (born 1965), New Zealand cricketer
David Alan Leonard, a Christian musician in the band All Sons & Daughters